Brian Leonel Benítez (born 17 April 1996) is an Argentine professional footballer who plays as a midfielder for Greek Super League 2 club Kalamata.

Career
Benítez began his senior career with San Lorenzo of the Argentine Primera División. On 18 August 2017, Benítez was loaned to Primera B Metropolitana side Defensores de Belgrano. He made twenty-four appearances, including his professional career debut versus Sacachispas on 9 September, during the 2017–18 campaign as the club were promoted via the play-offs. Benítez was again loaned out in August 2018, this time to Almagro.

Career statistics
.

References

External links

1996 births
Living people
People from Ramos Mejía
Argentine footballers
Association football midfielders
Argentine Primera División players
Primera B Metropolitana players
Primera Nacional players
San Lorenzo de Almagro footballers
Defensores de Belgrano footballers
Club Almagro players
San Martín de San Juan footballers
Sportspeople from Buenos Aires Province